The 16th NKP Salve Challenger Trophy was an Indian domestic cricket tournament that was held in Indore from 8 October to 11 October 2010. The series involved the domestic teams from India which were India Blue, India Red, and India Green. India Blue defeated India Red by 140 runs in the final to become the champions of the tournament.

Squads

Points Table

Matches

Group stage

Final

References

Indian domestic cricket competitions